The 2013 KW Fall Classic was held from September 26 to 29 at the Kitchener-Waterloo Granite Club in Waterloo, Ontario in 2013–14 World Curling Tour. The men's event was held in a triple knockout format, while the women's event will be held in a round robin format. The purse for the men's event was CAD$8,500, while the purse for the women's event was CAD$15,000.

Men

Teams

Knockout results
The draw is listed as follows:

A event

B event

C event

Playoffs

Women

Teams

Round Robin Standings
Final Round Robin Standings

Playoffs

References

External links

2013 in Canadian curling
Sport in Waterloo, Ontario
Curling in Ontario
2013 in Ontario